Erkner is a town in the Oder-Spree District of Brandenburg, Germany, located on the south-eastern edge of the German capital city Berlin.

Geography
The town is located between the lakes Dämeritzsee, a part of the river Spree, and Flakensee, surrounded by a mainly forested landscape. Neighbouring municipalities are Woltersdorf in the north, Grünheide (Mark) in the east, Gosen-Neu Zittau in the south and Berlin in the west.

History
In 1579, Erkner was first mentioned in the Rüdersdorf church records as "Arckenow", a fishermen's place of residence („Mittwoch s post Convers, Pauli hat Hans der Fischer im Arckenow taufen lassen Und ist genant Maria.“). This field name developed to Erkenau-Erkener-Erkner. Until 1701 the settlement only had seven houses.

This changed in 1712, when a coaching inn for the new Post road from Berlin to Frankfurt (Oder) was built. As of 1748, three Palatine farming families settled "on the Buchhorst" (a locality within Erkner). Later they moved their homesteads to the present-day Buchhorster Straße. One of those homesteads now houses the Heimatmuseum (local history museum) with Erkner's oldest house.
In 1752, Prussian king Friedrich II installed a Mulberry plantation with 1,500 trees, of which only one is still standing in today's Friedrichstraße.

The village grew up to 260 inhabitants in 1805. At this time Erkner was a barge-men's village with several localities: „The Erkner“, Neu Buchhorst, Schönschornstein, Alte Hausstelle, Hohenbinde, Jägerbude and until 1884 Woltersdorfer Schleuse. Along the waterways between the rivers Oder, Spree, Havel and Elbe, were mass transports of lime, coal and other materials from the limestone mine in nearby Rüdersdorf to Berlin and from the industrial areas of Silesia to Berlin respectively. In 1822, two thirds of the families had a barge-men as head of the household. Supported also by five wharfs in the village, this profession continued to be important for Erkner until the end of the 19th century.

In 1842, the Berlin-Frankfurt Railway opened with a stop in Erkner, which was upgraded to a railway station the following year due to the large number of excursionists from Berlin. From 1846, this railway connected Berlin via Erkner with Breslau and thereby two important industrial areas of Prussia.

The industrialisation of Erkner began in 1860 with the founding of the first Continental European tar production unit by Julius Rütgers. In 1909, the world's first industrialised production of Plastics (Bakelite) began on his premises in cooperation with Leo Baekeland. On May 25, 1910 the Bakelite Gesellschaft m.b.H. Berlin-Erkner (Link to German Wikipedia) was founded here. A few months later, on October 10, Baekeland founded the General Bakelite Company in Perth Amboy, New Jersey.

From 1885–89 the German writer and later Nobel laureate Gerhard Hauptmann lived in Erkner, incorporating several local people and places into his stories. His three sons were born at this time. In 1888, the town officially adopted the name Erkner. The Catholic parish St. Boniface Erkner was founded in 1910.

On June 6, 1998 Erkner was the first town in Eastern Germany to be granted city rights after the German Reunification.

Demography

Twinned Towns
Erkner is a twin town of Gołuchów in the Greater Poland Voivodeship.

Culture and Sights

Museums
 Gerhart-Hauptmann-Museum, hosting a permanent exhibition about the life and work of Gerhart Hauptmann (writer and winner of the Nobel Prize in Literature), and a research library.
 Heimatmuseum, local history museum with a permanent exhibition about the history of Erkner and since 2008 hosting an additional exhibition about the town's industrial development.

Churches
 Protestant Genezareth Church (built 1896, destroyed March 8, 1944, rebuilt 1945-46)
 Catholic St. Boniface Church (built 1932, destroyed March 8, 1944, rebuilt 1949)
 New Apostolic Church (built 1996)

Memorials
 Memorial to all victims of fascism, war and tyranny on the corner of Neu-Zittauer Straße and Hohenbinder Weg.

Photo Gallery

Personalities

Honorary citizen

 Carl Bechstein (1826-1900), piano and grand piano maker, honorary citizen since 1893, his former villa now serves as the town hall
 Bernd Rühle (1932–2014), local historian, principal of the cultural office and of the museum of local history, honorary citizen since 2003

Sons and daughters of the city
 Ivo Hauptmann (1886-1973), painter, oldest son of Gerhart Hauptmann
 Horst Seeger (1926-1999), musicologist, opera director

People associated with Erkner 
 Gerhart Hauptmann (1862-1946), Literature Nobel Prize Laureate, lived from 1885 to 1889 in Erkner. His three sons were born in Erkner. Numerous works by Hauptmann play in or around Erkner.
 Walter Sawall (1899-1953), two-time world champion in motor-paced racing, lived and died in Erkner, a street is named after him since 1932

See also
Erkner station
Dämeritzsee

References

External links
 Erkner.de Official website 

Localities in Oder-Spree